Berlin can refer to several German 9 cm wavelength (3.3 GHz) microwave radars of World War II, developed after the capture of examples of the British cavity magnetron in the H2S radar.
 FuG 224 Berlin A of 1944, a PPI ground mapping radar
 FuG 240 Berlin N1 of 1945, an airborne interception radar for nightfighters
 FuMO 81, a naval development of the FuG 224 
 FuMO 83 Berlin I, for U-boats
 FuMO 84 Berlin II, for the type XXI U-boat

World War II German radars